Paul Mitchell (born 13 January 1975) is a Zimbabwean cricketer. He played two first-class matches for Mashonaland in 1994/95.

See also
 List of Mashonaland first-class cricketers

References

External links
 

1975 births
Living people
Zimbabwean cricketers
Mashonaland cricketers
Sportspeople from Harare